Punjab Roadways is a commercial organization and With Punbus has been operating 2.77 lacs km daily for different State/Inter-state routes.  About 5.00 Lacs passengers travel daily in the buses of Punjab Roadways. 360 new buses has been purchased and put on the routes during the financial year 2005-06 by Punjab State Bus Stand Management Company Ltd. (PUNBUS) by raising loan of ₹ 40.00 Crore from Oriental Bank Of Commerce. These buses are being operated by the PUNBUS on the valid route permits of the Punjab Roadways and are giving good results. The proposal to purchase 300 more buses by PUNBUS by taking loan of ₹ 40.00 Crore from the banks has been finalized.
Due to consistency and punctuality in time it is the became the best choice for passengers in north area .
Punjab Roadways came into being in the year 1948 with a fleet of 13 buses, which rose gradually to its highest strength of 2407 buses in the year 1985. With an objective to provide better service, Punjab Roadways replaced 534 buses in 1997-98 and 1998-99 through PUNBUS a fully owned Government Company. In the year 2000, 150 buses under Kilometer Scheme were inducted to reinforce the fleet of Punjab Roadways by hiring Private buses and to operate on the routes, on which Punjab Roadways holds valid Permits. The primary objective of Punjab Roadways is to provide transport service in the state of Punjab with connecting service to adjoining states. 

Punjab Roadways has 18 depots viz Chandigarh, Roopnagar, Ludhiana, Ferozepur, Moga, Jagraon, Nangal, Jalandhar-1, Jalandhar-2, Nawanshehar, Batala, Pathankot, Hoshiarpur, Amritsar-1, Amritsar-2, Taran Taaran, Patti and Mukatsar.

References

External links 
 Punjab Roadways 

State road transport corporations of India
Transport in Punjab, India
1948 establishments in East Punjab
Government agencies established in 1948
Transport companies established in 1948
Companies based in Punjab, India